Xanthoria is a genus of lichenized fungi in the family Teloschistaceae. Common names include orange lichen,  orange wall lichen, and sunburst lichen. They can be identified by their characteristic squamulose morphology with distinctive "fairy cups".

Species

Xanthoria aureola 
Xanthoria calcicola 
Xanthoria ectaneoides 
Xanthoria elegans  – elegant orange wall lichen, elegant sunburst lichen
Xanthoria juniperina 
Xanthoria kangarooensis 
Xanthoria lapalmaensis 
Xanthoria parietina  – common orange lichen, yellow scale, maritime sunburst lichen, shore lichen
Xanthoria schummii 
Xanthoria splendidula 
Xanthoria ulophyllodes  – powdery sunburst lichen
Xanthoria whinrayi 
Xanthoria yorkensis 

The taxa Xanthoria coomae  and Xanthoria polessica  were determined to be the same species as X. parietina in a 2020 publication.

References

Teloschistales
Lichen genera
Teloschistales genera
Taxa described in 1825
Taxa named by Elias Magnus Fries